Kalasalingam Academy of Research and Education (KARE), formerly Arulmigu Kalasalingam College of Engineering and Kalasalingam University, is a private deemed to be university located in Krishnankoil near Rajapalayam in Tamil Nadu, India. The campus is close to the ancient temple town of Srivilliputhur.

History 
Kalasalingam Academy of Research and Education was established in 1984 by the Kalasalingam Anandam Ammal Charities. "Kalvivallal" Thiru T. Kalasalingam, veteran freedom fighter, was the founder chairman. It was granted deemed to be university status in 2006. In November 2017, following a directive by the University Grants Commission (UGC) to drop the "University" from the name

Location
The location is at the foothills of the Western Ghats in a rural setting of Virudhunagar District.

Courses offered
The Deemed to be university offers Bachelor of Technology (BTech) and Master of Technology (M.TECH.) degrees in the following fields:
 Agricultural Engineering
 Automobile Engineering
 Biotechnology
 Chemical Engineering
 Civil Engineering
 Computer Science and Engineering
 Electronics and Communication Engineering
 Electrical and Electronics Engineering
 Electronics and Instrumentation Engineering
 Food Engineering
 Information and Communication Technology
 Information Technology
 Manufacturing Engineering
 Mechanical Engineering
 Aeronautical Engineering
 Biomedical Engineering

There is different approaches of getting admitted into undergraduate, postgraduate and research program of Kalasalingam university.

Central and departmental libraries
Extensive collection of academic volumes and titles
Popular periodicals
National and international journals
Supplementary digital resources (CD-ROMs and audio cassette equivalent)

Campus
The Deemed to be University sporting facilities include an athletic track, basketball courts, tennis courts and a football ground. The campus is WiFi enabled and available with a SunFire 4800 enterprise server, a SunFire T1000 server, six IBM Blade servers, four Wipro rack servers, six desktop servers (from HP and HCL), and nine TB of storage for the computing and storage needs of the faculty and students. The central server farm includes file servers, a database server, a mail server, a web server, a backup server, a proxy server, and an e-learning server.

Examination system
The academic year is divided into two semesters named as Even and Odd. Each semester has three internal exams and one final exam (semester exam) for all theory subjects. Generally, semester exam questions are from Anna University. Laboratory courses usually have two internal exams followed by the final exam. Most of the exams are theoretical, similar to other engineering colleges in India. It follows the Choice Based Credit System (CBCS).

Rankings

Kalasalingam Academy of Research and Education was ranked 39 among engineering colleges by the National Institutional Ranking Framework (NIRF) in 2022.

References

External links 
 

Universities in Tamil Nadu
Education in Virudhunagar district
Educational institutions established in 1984
1984 establishments in Tamil Nadu